Vitularia is a genus of sea snails, marine gastropod mollusks in the family Muricidae, the murex snails or rock snails.

Species
Species within the genus Vitularia include:

 Vitularia crenifer (Montrouzier, 1861)
 Vitularia miliaris (Gmelin, 1791)
 Vitularia minima Bozzetti, 2006
 Vitularia salebrosa (King & Broderip, 1832)
 Vitularia sandwichensis (Pease, 1861)
 Vitularia triangularis Bozzetti, 2009

References

Muricopsinae